The second season of the American television series Superstore was ordered on February 23, 2016. On May 15, 2016, NBC announced that Superstore would be moving to Thursdays in the 8 p.m. time slot, leading off NBC's Thursday night primetime programming in the 2016–17 season. The season premiered on September 22, 2016, and concluded on May 4, 2017. On September 23, 2016, NBC gave the series a full season order of 21 episodes.

Superstore follows a group of employees working at Cloud 9, a fictional big-box store in St. Louis, Missouri. The ensemble and supporting cast features America Ferrera, Ben Feldman, Lauren Ash, Colton Dunn, Nico Santos, Nichole Sakura and Mark McKinney.

Cast

Main
America Ferrera as Amy Dubanowski 
Ben Feldman as Jonah Simms
Lauren Ash as Dina Fox
Colton Dunn as Garrett McNeil
Nico Santos as Mateo Fernando Aquino Liwanag
Nichole Bloom as Cheyenne Tyler Lee
Mark McKinney as Glenn Sturgis

Recurring
 Johnny Pemberton as Bo Derek Thompson
 Kaliko Kauahi as Sandra
 Josh Lawson as Tate
 Michael Bunin as Jeff Sutton
 Ryan Gaul as Adam Dubanowski
 Jon Barinholtz as Marcus

Co-starring 
 Linda Porter as Myrtle
 Irene White as Carol
 Kelly Schumann as Justine

Guest 
 Cecily Strong as Missy Jones

Episodes

Production

Development
The day after the first season finale had aired, Superstore was renewed for a second season on NBC. The second season will contain 13 episodes, but on September 21, 2016, the day before the second season premiere, NBC ordered 9 additional scripts, possibly making the episode-count up to 22 episodes. NBC announced on May 15, 2016, that the show had been moved, and would be airing on Thursdays in the time slot 8 p.m. The show will be leading off NBC's Thursday night primetime programming in the 2016–17 season. It was announced the same day that the second season would begin airing on September 22, 2016. On August 3, 2016, it was announced that Michael Bunin would be playing a recurring role in the second season as Jeff, Cloud 9's district manager. A trailer for the new season was released on September 8, 2016. A promotional poster was released on August 5, 2016. On September 23, 2016, NBC gave the series a full season order of 22 episodes.

Olympics-themed episode
To promote the second season, NBC announced on May 15, 2016, that it would be airing a special Olympics-themed episode of Superstore during the network's coverage of the 2016 Summer Olympics in Rio de Janeiro. On June 30, 2016, it was announced that the episode would be airing on August 19, 2016, in one of the last days in the Olympics. Executive producer Justin Spitzer revealed in an interview during NBC's TCA Press Tour that the plot in the episode would occur in the middle of the first season, not after the first season finale. The episode included guest appearances from  real-life Olympic medalists Tara Lipinski, Apolo Ohno and McKayla Maroney, in addition to Cecily Strong who played the fictional Olympic medalist Missy Jones. The episode received a series high of 9.67 million total viewers, up 34 percent from the previous high of 7.21 million, which was achieved in the series premiere. The special episode also achieved a 3.0 rating in the 18-49 demographic, a full point up from the premiere episode's 2.0.

Ratings

Home media

References

External links
 
 
 

2016 American television seasons
2017 American television seasons
Superstore (TV series)